Juan Carlos Lescano (born 18 December 1990) is an Argentine football forward who plays for Ferrocarril Midland.

Career 
Born in Rosario, Santa Fe, Lescano started his career in the youth system of Central Córdoba in neighbouring Rosario, going on to appear  more than 62 times for the club.

In July 2012, River Plate bought Lescano from Central Córdoba for $400,000.

In 2013 Juan Carlos will be playing for Everton FC in Vina del Mar Chile .

Career statistics

External links 

1990 births
Living people
Footballers from Rosario, Santa Fe
Argentine footballers
Argentine expatriate footballers
Association football forwards
Central Córdoba de Rosario footballers
Club Atlético River Plate footballers
Everton de Viña del Mar footballers
Deportivo Merlo footballers
Sportivo Belgrano footballers
León de Huánuco footballers
Deportivo Municipal footballers
Arsenal de Sarandí footballers
Club Ferrocarril Midland players
Expatriate footballers in Chile
Primera B Metropolitana players
Chilean Primera División players
Argentine Primera División players
Primera Nacional players
Peruvian Primera División players